Pilar Cristina Roxas Amador (born 16 March 1966), commonly known by her stage name Pinky Amador, is a Filipina actress, singer, commercial model and TV host.

Amador was in the original London cast of the Cameron Mackintosh musical hit Miss Saigon. She is seen mostly on GMA Network, but lately in ABS-CBN.

Background
Amador is the niece of the late Zenaida Amador, the founder of Repertory Philippines.

She is the youngest of three children from a Spanish Filipino family. She is 5 feet 3 inches tall and has dark brown hair and eyes.

Amador had a pet cat called Leonidas, a Persian cat. However, on August 11, 2022, her cat passed away. It was 16 years old.

Acting

Amador graduated from Bristol Old Vic Theatre School (an affiliated school of the University of the West of England) with a master's degree in Acting, where she was awarded with a Chevening Scholarship due to excellence. Prior to this, she earned her Bachelor of Arts degree in mass communication from Assumption College San Lorenzo. She came to theatre via lead roles in plays I Ought to Be in Pictures, Agnes of God and The Foreigner for which she has won Aliw Awards for Best Stage Actress.

She then ventured into television and film and was cast in the original production of Miss Saigon in London. Since then, she has performed on tour in the UK, and continued her television and film career both in the UK and the Philippines, with over 70 plays and musicals to her credit, over 300 television appearances, and 60 films to date. Mostly known for her antagonist role in television and films, Amador finds it refreshing to once more play the other side of the spectrum in her current TV series. She was recently part of the TV remake Kaya Kong Abutin Ang Langit starring Angelika dela Cruz and Iza Calzado.

She finished filming You To Me Are Everything for GMA Films/Regal Films and is currently guesting in Magkaribal for ABS-CBN, and has just returned to essay her character Molly Corpuz in Momay, shown daily on ABS-CBN.  She also appears as Baroness Elsa Schraeder in Resorts World Manila's production of The Sound of Music. Currently, Pinky portrayed a villain role in Abot-Kamay na Pangarap as the evil and bitter wife of Doctor Tanyag.

Awards and nominations

1983: Agnes of God – Aliw Award for Best Stage Actress
1987: The Foreigner – Aliw Award for Best Stage Actress
1987: Star Awards nomination for Best Newcomer – Magdusa Ka
1997: Parangal ng Bayan (National Young Achiever's Award) for Arts & Culture
1998: Urian Award nomination for Best Supporting Actress – Sana’y Pag-ibig Na
2011: Zsa Zsa Zaturnah Ze Muzical Vack with a Vengeance – Gawad Buhay Awards for Best Supporting Actress in a Musical
2013: Piaf – Aliw Awards nomination for Best Actress in a Musical

Filmography

Television

Theatrical shows

Movies

References

External links

 

1966 births
Living people
20th-century Filipino actresses
21st-century Filipino actresses
ABS-CBN personalities
Alumni of the University of the West of England, Bristol
Filipino female models
Filipino women pop singers
Filipino film actresses
Filipino musical theatre actresses
Filipino people of Spanish descent
Filipino television actresses
Filipino women comedians
GMA Network personalities
Viva Artists Agency